Trumaine Barnett-Epps (born September 19, 1987), professionally known as DJ Tab, is an American hip hop DJ, record producer and entrepreneur. He has worked with DJ Khaled, Chris Brown, Bow Wow and J-Kwon. In 2015, he was nominated in the Midwest Regional Club DJ of the Year at the 4th edition of the annual Global Spin Awards. He is presently the owner of Streetz 105.1, and his is currently a radio personality on Sirius XM Shade 45 on Sunday nights.

Early life and career
Born on 19 September 1987 in St. Louis, Missouri, U.S, DJ Tab started DJing at the age of 11 after he was introduced to the profession while watching local DJs around Saint Louis at local skating rinks and teen nightclubs. An alumnus of the ITT Technical Institute where he received a bachelor's degree in Criminal Justice, DJ Tab's big break came in his sophomore year of high school when a local female promoter booked him and J-Kwon for a high school Christmas concert. During sound check, J-Kwon's show disc malfunctioned and Tab ended up running J-Kwon sound check using the vinyl record of J-Kwon hit 2003 single "Tipsy", a song which went on to peak at number 2 on the Billboard Hot 100.

DJ Tab and J-Kwon later made appearances on multiple television shows including BET Rap City, Showtime at the Apollo and MTV's Total Request Live amongst others. In 2015, DJ Tab launched Empire Clothing, a men's online clothing store before he went on to launch his own energy drink called Get-N-Tune in 2016.

Discography

Mixtapes

Awards and nominations
In April 2016, DJ Tab was honoured and listed on Deluxe Magazine's "Emerging30", a list of 30 under-30 individuals who have redefined their respective fields. In 2018, he was recognized at the 2018 Stifel Bank & Trust Black Tie Community Award where he was the Arts & Entertainment Recipient winner.

References

External links

1987 births
Living people
People from St. Louis
African-American DJs
Record producers from Missouri
American hip hop record producers
Musicians from St. Louis
Mixtape DJs
21st-century African-American people
20th-century African-American people